In functional analysis and related areas of mathematics, a barrelled space (also written barreled space) is a topological vector space (TVS) for which every barrelled set in the space is a neighbourhood for the zero vector. 
A barrelled set or a barrel in a topological vector space is a set that is convex, balanced, absorbing, and closed. 
Barrelled spaces are studied because a form of the Banach–Steinhaus theorem still holds for them. 

Barrels

Every barrel must contain the origin.

In fact, every locally convex topological vector space has a neighborhood basis at its origin consisting entirely of barrels. However, in general, there  exist barrels that are not neighborhoods of the origin; "barrelled spaces" are exactly those TVSs in which every barrel is necessarily a neighborhood of the origin. Every finite dimensional topological vector space is a barrelled space so examples of barrels that are not neighborhoods of the origin can only be found in infinite dimensional spaces.

Examples of barrels and non-barrels

The closure of any convex, balanced, and absorbing subset is a barrel. This is because the closure of any convex (respectively, any balanced, any absorbing) subset has this same property. 

Properties of barrels

In any topological vector space (TVS)  every barrel in  absorbs every compact convex subset of 
In any locally convex Hausdorff TVS  every barrel in  absorbs every convex bounded complete subset of 
Let  be a pairing and let  be a locally convex topology on  consistent with duality.
Suppose  is a vector subspace of finite codimension in a locally convex space  and  If  is a barrel (resp. bornivorous barrel, bornivorous disk) in  then there exists a barrel (resp. bornivorous barrel, bornivorous disk)  in  such that

Characterizations of barreled spaces

Denote by  the space of continuous linear maps from  into 

If  is a Hausdorff topological vector space (TVS) with continuous dual space  then the following are equivalent:

 is barrelled.
 An F-space is a complete metrizable TVS.
Every closed linear operator from  into a complete metrizable TVS is continuous.
 A linear map  is called closed if its graph is a closed subset of 
Every Hausdorff TVS topology  on  that has a neighborhood basis of the origin consisting of -closed set is course than 

If  is locally convex space then this list may be extended by appending:
 It follows from the above two characterizations that in the class of locally convex TVS, barrelled spaces are exactly those for which the uniform boundedness principal holds.
Every -bounded subset of the continuous dual space  is equicontinuous (this provides a partial converse to the Banach-Steinhaus theorem).
 carries the strong dual topology 
Every linear map  into a locally convex space  is almost continuous.
Every surjective linear map  from a locally convex space  is almost open.
If  is a locally convex topology on  such that  has a neighborhood basis at the origin consisting of -closed sets, then  is weaker than 

If  is a Hausdorff locally convex space then this list may be extended by appending:
Closed graph theorem: Every closed linear operator  into a Banach space  is continuous.
 The linear operator is called  if its graph is a closed subset of 
For every subset  of the continuous dual space of  the following properties are equivalent:  is
equicontinuous;
relatively weakly compact;
strongly bounded;
weakly bounded.

If  is metrizable topological vector space then this list may be extended by appending:

If  is a locally convex metrizable topological vector space then this list may be extended by appending:
():  is not the union of an increase sequence of nowhere dense disks.

Examples and sufficient conditions

Each of the following topological vector spaces is barreled:
TVSs that are Baire space.
 Consequently, every topological vector space that is of the second category in itself is barrelled.
F-spaces, Fréchet spaces, Banach spaces, and Hilbert spaces.
 However, there exist normed vector spaces that are  barrelled. For example, if the -space  is topologized as a subspace of  then it is not barrelled.
Complete pseudometrizable TVSs.
 Consequently, every finite-dimensional TVS is barrelled.
Montel spaces.
Strong dual spaces of Montel spaces (since they are necessarily Montel spaces).
A locally convex quasi-barrelled space that is also a σ-barrelled space.
A sequentially complete quasibarrelled space.
A quasi-complete Hausdorff locally convex infrabarrelled space.
 A TVS is called quasi-complete if every closed and bounded subset is complete.
A TVS with a dense barrelled vector subspace.
 Thus the completion of a barreled space is barrelled.
A Hausdorff locally convex TVS with a dense infrabarrelled vector subspace.
 Thus the completion of an infrabarrelled Hausdorff locally convex space is barrelled.
A vector subspace of a barrelled space that has countable codimensional.
 In particular, a finite codimensional vector subspace of a barrelled space is barreled.
A locally convex ultrabarelled TVS.
A Hausdorff locally convex TVS  such that every weakly bounded subset of its continuous dual space is equicontinuous.
A locally convex TVS  such that for every Banach space  a closed linear map of  into  is necessarily continuous.
A product of a family of barreled spaces.
A locally convex direct sum and the inductive limit of a family of barrelled spaces.
A quotient of a barrelled space.
A Hausdorff sequentially complete quasibarrelled boundedly summing TVS.
A locally convex Hausdorff reflexive space is barrelled.

Counter examples

A barrelled space need not be Montel, complete, metrizable, unordered Baire-like, nor the inductive limit of Banach spaces.
Not all normed spaces are barrelled. However, they are all infrabarrelled.
A closed subspace of a barreled space is not necessarily countably quasi-barreled (and thus not necessarily barrelled).
There exists a dense vector subspace of the Fréchet barrelled space  that is not barrelled.
There exist complete locally convex TVSs that are not barrelled.
The finest locally convex topology on an infinite-dimensional vector space is a Hausdorff barrelled space that is a meagre subset of itself (and thus not a Baire space).

Properties of barreled spaces

Banach–Steinhaus generalization

The importance of barrelled spaces is due mainly to the following results.

The Banach-Steinhaus theorem is a corollary of the above result. When the vector space  consists of the complex numbers then the following generalization also holds.

Recall that a linear map  is called closed if its graph is a closed subset of

Other properties

Every Hausdorff barrelled space is quasi-barrelled.
A linear map from a barrelled space into a locally convex space is almost continuous.
A linear map from a locally convex space to a barrelled space is almost open.
A separately continuous bilinear map from a product of barrelled spaces into a locally convex space is hypocontinuous.
A linear map with a closed graph from a barreled TVS into a -complete TVS is necessarily continuous.

See also

References

Bibliography

  
  
 
  
  
  
  
  
  
  
  
  
  
  
 
  
  
  
  

  
  

Topological vector spaces